Robert Blake (or variants) may refer to:

Sports
 Bob Blake (American football) (1885–1962), American football player
 Robbie Blake (born 1976), English footballer
 Bob Blake (ice hockey) (1914–2008), American ice hockey player
 Rob Blake (born 1969), Canadian ice hockey player

Politics
 Robert O. Blake (1921–2015), American diplomat
 Robert O. Blake, Jr. (born 1957), American diplomat, son of above

Military
 Robert Blake (admiral) (1598–1657), English admiral
 Robert Blake (Medal of Honor), American Civil War sailor, first African-American to receive the Medal of Honor
 Robert Blake (USMC) (1894–1983), United States Marine Corps general

Entertainment
 Robert Blake (actor) (1933–2023), American actor, starred in the TV series Baretta
 Robert Blake (folk singer) (fl. 21st century), American folk singer
 Bobby Blake (born 1958), American pornographic actor turned Baptist elder

Other
 Robert Blake (cabinetmaker) (fl. 1826–1839), London cabinetmaker
 Robert Blake (dentist) (1772–1822), Irish dentist
 Robert Blake, Baron Blake (1916–2003), English historian
 Robert Pierpont Blake (1886–1950), American Byzantist and Orientalist
 Robert R. Blake (1918–2004), American management theoretician, developer of the Managerial Grid Model
 Robert Blake, brother of poet William Blake (1757–1827), who William claimed visited him in his dreams
 Bob Blake, a Jeopardy! contestant who won the 1990 Tournament of Champions

In fiction
 Bob Blake, in a series of African-American westerns from the 1930s played by Herb Jeffries
 Robert Blake, from Bungie' computer game Marathon 2: Durandal
 Robert Harrison Blake, from H. P. Lovecraft's short story "The Haunter of the Dark"

See also
Blake
Blake (disambiguation)